Open edX is the open-source platform software whose development led to the creation of the edX organization. On June 1, 2013, edX open sourced the platform, naming it Open edX to distinguish it from the organization itself. The source code can be found on GitHub. The platform was originally developed by Piotr Mitros, as a research project at MIT, with maintenance transferred to edX in 2012.

When edX was acquired in 2021 by 2U, the Open edX team and maintenance were transferred to the Center for Reimagining Learning (tCRIL), a nonprofit founded by Harvard and MIT with the proceeds from the acquisition.

Uses 
Open EdX was designed for the EdX project, which remains the largest global installation as of 2022, with over 3000 courses and 500,000 regular users. The Open EdX community maintains a catalog of other installations, including fully-hosted learning sites open to public courses and 350 other instances run by organizations of all sizes.

An Open EdX marketplace also features partners that provide various services to community members running their own instances in multiple languages.

Software 

The platform has been released one to two times a year since 2013.  Each release is named after a tree, honoring the tree of knowledge.

The Open edX server-side software is based on Python, with Django as the web application framework.

Community 
Platform design and development have been codesigned with its community from early in the project's history.  The community maintains several working groups focused on marketing, build-test-release cycles, translation, data design, front-end design, and code deprecation.

The community hosts an annual Open edX Conference, which rotates worldwide each year. In 2022 it was held in Portugal.

References

External links 
 Open edX Conference site
 Documentation site for the platform

Free educational software
Free learning management systems
Free learning support software
Learning management systems
Free content management systems
Virtual learning environments
Classroom management software